Eliot Kleinberg is an author and a retired (December 2020) news and features writer for the Palm Beach Post in Palm Beach County, Florida.

Born in Coral Gables, Florida, Kleinberg grew up in South Florida and received two degrees from the University of Florida. He was a reporter for The Dallas Morning News from 1984 through 1987, when he returned to Florida and joined the Palm Beach Post. He has written extensively about many different aspects of Florida, and is most notable for his books Weird Florida and Weird Florida II, and Black Cloud, a history of the great 1928 Okeechobee Hurricane. His first work of fiction is Peace River, a historical novel set during the Civil War. He now is assembling a series of mysteries featuring 1920s Miami police detective Nate Moran. He also publishes a blog about bad writing, and how to fix it, called "Something Went Horribly Wrong."

Bibliography 
Pioneers in Paradise: West Palm Beach, the First 100 Years
Florida Fun Facts
Historical Traveler's Guide to Florida
Weird Florida
War in Paradise: Stories of World War II in Florida
Our Century (Palm Beach Post staff)
Black Cloud: The Deadly Hurricane of 1928
Weird Florida II: In a State of Shock
Palm Beach Past: The Best of Post Time
Wicked Palm Beach: Lifestyles of the Rich and Heinous
Palm Beach County at 100 (Palm Beach Post staff)

References

External links
Eliot Kleinberg's website
Eliot Kleinberg's Palm Beach Post articles
Article on the 1928 Okeechobee Hurricane by Kleinberg
Eliot Kleinberg's author Facebook page

Living people
Writers from Coral Gables, Florida
University of Florida alumni
American newspaper journalists
Year of birth missing (living people)